The Independent Publishers Guild (IPG), founded in 1962, is an association set up to support the needs of independent firms in the publishing industry in the United Kingdom, with a current membership of more than 600 companies. The IPG is a not-for-profit limited company and has a non-executive board of directors. The chief executive is currently Bridget Shine. The IPG is a forum that supports enables the exchange of information and the strengthening of partnerships between its membership of independent publishers and other relevant professional bodies.

History
Founded in 1962, the organisation was originally known as the Independent Publishers Group until in 1966/67, it became the Independent Publishers Guild.

The IPG's activities include conferences, the annual IPG Awards, which recognise the achievements of individuals and companies within the UK industry, and collective stands at the London Book Fair and the Frankfurt Book Fair.

In 2015, the IPG became a member of the Publishers Licensing Society, now known as Publishers' Licensing Services (PLS), an organisation owned and managed by the four main trade associations, the others being the Publishers' Association (PA), the Professional Publishers Association (PPA), and the Association of Learned and Professional Society Publishers (ALPSP).

IPG Independent Publishing Awards
In 2007, to recognise outstanding achievements in various aspects of the publishing industry the IPG launched the Independent Publishing Awards, which have become are the UK's biggest annual celebration of independent publishing.

References

External links
 Official website

1962 establishments in the United Kingdom
Publishing in the United Kingdom
Organizations established in 1962
Whitland
Organisations based in Carmarthenshire